Piotra or Pyotra may refer to:

Pyotra Krecheuski (1879–1928), Belarusian statesman
Piotra Sych (1912–1963), Belarusian writer and journalist

See also
Piatro Sadoŭski (born 1941), Belarusian linguist
Piotra Skargi Street in Bydgoszcz
Bohemannia piotra, moth of the family Nepticulidae